Connecticut's 1st State Senate district elects one member to the Connecticut State Senate. The district encompasses parts of Hartford and Wethersfield. It is currently represented by Democrat John Fonfara, who has served since 1997.

Recent elections

2018

2016

2014

2012

References

01